Brad Davis The Shredder is an American country/folk guitarist and singer-songwriter. Initially, a member of country singer Marty Stuart's road band, Davis has also performed with Earl Scruggs, Sam Bush, Billy Bob Thornton and several other country and musical acts, in addition to writing songs for artists like Tim McGraw, Jo-El Sonnier, Tony Trischka, and Thornton.

Davis also has a solo music career of his own, with several releases, both instrumental and vocal, and he has released instructional material on guitar playing, particularly the style of Flatpicking.

Role as a writer, producer, and studio musician

Brad Davis has had plenty of work as a guitarist, harmony vocalist, writer and producer for other music artists and movie soundtracks.

In the late 1980s, Davis was invited to become a member of the Ricky Skaggs band. Upon arriving in Nashville, he discovered the job had been given to another musician. As he needed to find a way to pay the bills, he found a job as a roving fiddle and guitar minstrel at Opryland USA.

In 1992, he became a member of Marty Stuart's road and studio band, the Rock and Roll Cowboys and continued in the band through 2002, touring across the world and appearing in music videos and television shows on CMT and what was then known as TNN. During this time, he also appeared on Stuart's gold-selling album This One's Gonna Hurt You, the Marty Stuart "Hit Pack", and Stuart's last MCA recording, "The Pilgrim".

After a jam with Stuart at the home of Earl Scruggs in 2001, Brad was invited to become a member of Scruggs' road band, "Earl Scruggs with Family & Friends", of which he is still a member. Davis appeared on a Grand Ole Opry episode, which aired on CMT, as part of this configuration, to sing "The Ballad of Jed Clampett". Other prominent musicians who have appeared in the Earl Scruggs band include Albert Lee and Jon Randall.

By 2002, Stuart had opted for a different sound (and record label), and all members parted ways to work on other projects. During this time, Davis established a musical partnership with Billy Bob Thornton, more famously known as the actor, in his road band and studio band, which continues to this day. All releases from Thornton, from his first in 2001, "Private Radio", to his latest under the new group, The Boxmasters, self-titled, feature Davis' guitar work and harmony vocals, and he co-wrote, performed on, and produced all tracks on Thorntons' CD, "Beautiful Door" (2007, Universal Records). Davis will tour with Thornton's "Boxmasters" across the United States in the summer of 2008, including TV appearances. He participated in the filming of the music video for the first single, which aired on GAC and CMT.

From 2003 to 2005, he was the guitarist and harmony vocalist in Sam Bush's road and studio band, and appeared on Bush's "King of My World" in 2005.

His unique playing can be heard on movie soundtracks, including Steven Seagal’s "Fire Down Below", and Billy Bob Thornton’s releases "Daddy And Them" and "Waking Up In Reno". He also recorded with Sheryl Crow, among others, on the Johnny Cash tribute album "Kindred Spirits", and played guitar on Warren Zevon’s final Grammy-winning recording, "The Wind".

In addition, he has toured, recorded or written with major artists such as Willie Nelson, Emmylou Harris, Pam Tillis, The Forester Sisters, Tommy Shaw (Styx), David Lee Roth (Van Halen), and Sweethearts of the Rodeo.

Solo career

Davis was born and raised in the Dallas, Texas area. He has spent his life performing on stage and touring with bluegrass, country, and rock acts from all over the world.

wHiTe wAter was a group formed by Davis in 1997.  Sam Bush, Marty Stuart, Stuart Duncan, and Roy Huskey Jr. are among those who appear on the group's only release, No Gold on the Highway.

I'm Not Gonna Let My Blues Bring Me Down was released in 2003 on FGM Records. The title track is a duet featuring fellow Texan and former roommate Jon Randall. "Tell Me Son" from the record features Billy Bob Thornton and Tommy Shaw. Other musicians on the record include Sam Bush, David Grier, John Jorgenson, Rob Ickes, Glen Duncan, and Earl Scruggs.

This World Ain't No Child followed in 2004 on FGM Records. Once again, Sam Bush appears on fiddle, mandolin, and slide mandolin. As this CD was recorded while Davis was a member of Bush's band, members Byron House and Chris Brown also contributed. John Cowan and Béla Fleck, who, with Bush, were part of the New Grass Revival, also contribute to the record. Additional musical assistance is contributed by Ickes, Jorgenson, Shaw, and Thornton, among others.

Over the years, Davis has had his songs recorded by various country and bluegrass artists, including country star Tim McGraw ("Ain't No Angels"), Grasstowne ("Love You Don't Know"), Jo-El Sonnier ("Can't Give My Heart Away"), Billy Bob Thornton ("Always Countin'", "Beautiful Door"), Hometown News ("All The Time"), and Tony Trischka ("I'm Singing Harmony").

Davis is often cited as the creator of the "double-down up" flatpicking technique. In fact it is known by many professional musicians especially those who attend the Steve Kaufman Flatpicking camp that he learned it from a fellow musician from the Caribbean . He has been a columnist for Flatpicking Guitar Magazine since 1996 and is currently Takamine's main guitar clinician, conducting dozens of music store clinics for Takamine Guitars each year. He has taught at Steve Kaufman's Flatpick Camp, Nashcamp, Camp Bluegrass, the St. Louis Flatpick Weekend, the Roanoke Bluegrass Weekend, and more.

He has also produced four instructional DVDs for Flatpicking Guitar Magazine, "Flatpick Jam", Volumes 1, 2, & 3 and a book/DVD/CD course called "Flatpicking the Blues". Additionally, he has produced several instructional courses for Mel Bay Publications, including the "Blue Book of Speedpicking", and a series of instructional Ear Training Cds.

He is the musical ambassador for Coffee Fool, a coffee company that is sponsoring both The Boxmasters tour and the Styx tours in 2008. At the 2008 NAMM trade show in Los Angeles, California, Davis and his band were asked to open for John Mayer and Phil Keaggy, and they received a standing ovation.

Discography
Climbin' Cole Hill (1995)
No Gold on the Highway by wHiTe wAter (1997)
I'm Not Gonna Let My Blues Bring Me Down (2003)
This World Ain't No Child (2004)
Where The Bluegrass Grows: The Bluegrass Tribute to Tim McGraw (2006, CMH Records)
The Bluegrass Tribute to Brad Paisley (2007, CMH Records)

Footnotes

External links
Brad Davis official site

American country guitarists
American country singer-songwriters
American folk guitarists
American male guitarists
American session musicians
Singer-songwriters from Texas
Living people
People from Commerce, Texas
Year of birth missing (living people)
Guitarists from Texas
Country musicians from Texas
American male singer-songwriters